African Science Academy (ASA) is an all-girls advanced-level school for Mathematics and Science established in August 2016 in Tema, Ghana, by the African Gifted Foundation, a UK, US and Ghana-registered charity. The academy provides academically-gifted, African girls from low income backgrounds with world-class STEM education, equipping them with the skills necessary to become leaders in the STEM industry. The academy is made up of girls from different nationalities across Africa. The girls foster the creation of a culturally rich background in the school, where Mathematics, Science and Technology are delivered in an inclusive environment.

History 
In 2016, the African Gifted Foundation established the African Science Academy (ASA) - a STEM-focused academy for gifted African girls from low-income backgrounds. The academy was founded by Dr Tom Ilube CBE, a technology entrepreneur and educational philanthropist to spur interest in the field of STEM  and to unleash the next generation of female scientists and engineers who will play a key role in Africa's development. In August 2016, the academy began with 24 students from Cameroon, Ethiopia, Nigeria, Sierra Leone, Uganda and Ghana. Since then, the academy has grown to attract girls from 12 African countries, including Togo, Rwanda, Eswantini, and South Africa. They have also doubled the size of their cohort from 25 to 50 students, following their announcement of a £1 million donation from their Lead Supporter, XTX Markets in August 2022. ASA is the first all-girl institution for advanced level Mathematics and Science in Africa.

Academics 
The academy accepts gifted students, between the ages of 16 and 19, who have successfully  completed their secondary school in Mathematics and Science. At ASA their students complete an intensive advanced-level programme, studying Cambridge International A-Levels in Maths, Further Maths and Physics in under 11 months. In addition to their studies, students are also given the opportunity to take on extracurricular courses in Computer Programming and Robotics. In the last 6 years, ASA has educated almost 125 students from 12 African countries, developing their potential as Africa's future leaders in STEM. ASA have an incredible impact on their students with 90% of its girls graduating with A-C in their Maths, Physics and Further Maths A-Levels. In 2022 they received their best-ever A-Level results with 100% of their students being awarded A-C in their Maths and Physics A-Levels and 94% of their students receiving A-C in their Further Maths A Level. At ASA, 100% of their students go on to further their education in STEM after graduation and 95% are awarded full scholarships to attend leading universities around the world; including Columbia University, Edinburgh University, Hong Kong University, Ashesi University, the African Leadership University and so on.

Media mention 
African Science Academy has been featured on CNN's Inside Africa documentary providing exposure to activities and programs run by the academy in supporting young women interested in STEM education.

Sponsorship 
In August, 2022 the African Science Academy announced their Lead Supporter, XTX Markets. The academy is also supported by a number of organisations including the Bank of America, The Black Heart Foundation, SThree and Tullow Oil to provide their girls with an outstanding education.

Partnership 
The ASA is one of the members of the Hali Access Network.

References

External links
 African Science Academy

Schools in Accra
Educational institutions established in 2016
Girls' schools in Ghana
Education in Ghana
2016 establishments in Ghana